Montebello Water Aerodrome  is located  west of Montebello, Quebec, Canada.

References

Registered aerodromes in Outaouais
Seaplane bases in Quebec